Girley Charlene Jazama is Namibian actress, scriptwriter and film producer.

Career
Jazama's film and theatre productions career has been on since about 2005. She became the second Namibian to be nominated in the Sotigui Awards, for Best Actor, after Adriano Visagie who was earlier nominated for his performance in "Salute!", which he won.

Her foremost appearance in the acting scene was in "The Lion King",  while she yet schooled at Karibib Private School.

She has been actively working in collaboration with the Pan-African Festival of Cinema and Television of Ouagadougou, for the recognition of talents in the acting scene of the African cinema and the diaspora.

In 2008, she was one of the seven writers selected by the production company, Optimedia, to write its new soap titled, "The Ties that Bind", for the Namibia Broadcasting Corporation. This production was Namibia's first homegrown television series.

In 2009, she played the role of "Schülerin" in the German language film, "Liebe, Babys und der Zauber Afrikas".

Jazama was a lead actor in the 2019 movie, "The White Line" in which she played the role of "Sylvia". In July 2019, the movie was internationally premiered at the 40th Durban International Film Festival and in many other film festivals worldwide.

Her 2019 29-minute-long short film, Baxu and the Giants which she co-produced alongside Andrew Botelle and directed by Florian Schott, was celebrated by the Namibian film industry as the first Namibian film on Netflix. 
In March 2020, the movie was nominated at the RapidLion International Film Festival in Johannesburg, South Africa for the "Best Humanitarian Film" award. It then premiered in the USA at the San Francisco Independent Short Film Festival and later in September of the same year at the Namibian Theatre & Film Awards 2019, where it received seven nominations. Also, the film received other nominations and awards.

Filmography

References

External links
 IMDB - Girley Jazama
 Starnow - Girley Charlene Jazama
 Africine - Girley Jazama

Namibian actors
Namibian film producers
Living people
Year of birth missing (living people)